Loch Awe (Scottish Gaelic: Loch Obha) is a large body of freshwater in Argyll and Bute, Scottish Highlands. It has also given its name to a village on its banks, variously known as Loch Awe or Lochawe. There are islands within the loch such as Innis Chonnell and Inishail.

The loch 
The loch runs approximately south-west to north-east, roughly parallel to the two sea lochs of Loch Etive and Loch Fyne. Via the River Awe and Loch Etive it drains westward from its northern end and thus into the Atlantic Ocean. At the narrowest section of the loch are North Port (Taychreggan Hotel) and South Port (Portsonachan Hotel). Once used by cattle drovers, a ferry ran between these shores to facilitate crossing to markets beyond. The Transatlantic Cable, which runs through the village of Kilchrenan, was laid across at this point in 1955.

Hydroelectric schemes
Loch Awe is the site of two hydroelectric facilities. One, (Inverawe power station; owned by SSE - formerly Scottish and Southern Energy), is a conventional hydro power scheme created by damming the River Awe in the Pass of Brander at Awe Barrage, and feeding the water through a large submerged tunnel; thus generating electricity as it emerges at the power station and rejoins the River Awe, flowing into Loch Etive. The turbine is of the Kaplan type, designed and constructed by Boving and Company of London, and develops 40,500 brake horsepower. This drives a single 30.5 MW English Electric alternator via a vertical shaft.

Water is also passed through the Awe Barrage, powering 2x Neyrpic 375 kW bulb turbines as it does so. In so doing, this water provides a constant flow into the upper River Awe. A fish pass also exists at Awe Barrage to allow the passage of spawning salmon into Loch Awe and beyond. The young salmon (smolts), eventually pass downstream either through the Inverawe hydro power station or the barrage structure. The hydro station features a slow rotating Kaplan turbine, which readily allows the passage of such small fish without harming them. Both Inverawe power station and the associated Awe Barrage were constructed by the North of Scotland Hydro Electricity Board during the late 1950s/early 1960s.

The second is a more unusual pumped storage facility, using a man-made loch in the hills above Loch Awe. Water is pumped up to the top pool (the headpond), during times of surplus power; and released to power 4 pump/generators situated inside the mountain at times of peak demand. The second project, known as Cruachan from the name of the hill above, (Ben Cruachan) has a visitor centre, which includes tours into the heart of the mountain. This scheme has an installed power capacity of 400 MW, and an energy capacity of 7 GWh. It was built by the North of Scotland Hydro Electricity Board before transferring into the ownership of Scottish Power, where it remained for many years. It was acquired by the Drax Energy group in January 2019.

A third project, located at Balliemeanoch, aims to store 1.5 GW for 30 hours.

Tourism
Loch Awe is renowned for its trout fishing. Salmon pass through the loch, coming past the barrage in the River Awe and continuing into the River Orchy. Loch Awe contains several ruined castles on islands, and at the northern end has one of the most photographed castles in Scotland, Kilchurn Castle, which in summer may be visited by a short boat trip or by a half mile walk from a small car park just after the bridge over the River Orchy.  Saint Conan's Kirk and Chapel of St Fyndoca are located in Loch Awe.

History

One of the oldest Argyll clans, the Macarthurs, owned lands around Loch Awe which was populated in close proximity with MacGregors, Campbells and Stewarts.

Clan Macarthur artefacts, including the four-poster state bed, are held at Inveraray Castle.

It was from Loch Awe and surrounding area that Clan Campbell established itself as a powerful family. In 1308, Robert the Bruce defeated the Clan MacDougall at the Battle of the Pass of Brander downstream from the loch.

Environs 

The A85 road and the West Highland Line run along the northern bank of the loch, and the A819 follows the south-east bank for a short distance up to the village of Cladich. From there the single-track B840 runs for the remaining distance to the head of the loch at Ford and then joining the A816 a short distance north of Kilmartin. Similarly, on the north-west side an unclassified single-track road runs the full length from the A85 in Taynuilt to Ford.

Lochawe village and Loch Awe railway station
At the northern tip of the Loch, a railway station was opened in 1880 when the Callander and Oban Railway passed that way, and a large luxury hotel was created (Loch Awe Hotel, 1871). There is also the Ben Cruachan Inn which used to be the coach-house for the hotel. A village has grown up around the hotel, essentially running along the single strip defined by the A85 road.  A steamer service used to operate on the loch from the pier just below the hotel, stopping at Portsonachan, Taycreggan, Eredine and Ford. The village now includes St Conan’s Kirk, one of the most interesting pieces of Church architecture in Scotland. Confusingly, while the railway station is called Loch Awe, the village is contracted to Lochawe. The author Mary Stewart resided in her Lochard home, House of Letterawe, during the last several decades of her long life.

See also
Cailleach
List of reservoirs and dams in the United Kingdom

References

External links 

 The Loch Awe community web site
 Fishing-Argyll web site
 Video tour of St Conan's Kirk, Loch Awe
 Link to website of Alexander Carrick, sculptor of war memorial and St. Conan's Kirk
Three Lakes Challenge

 
Freshwater lochs of Scotland
Lochs of Argyll and Bute
Reservoirs in Argyll and Bute